Irish football may refer to:

 Association football in the Republic of Ireland
 Association football in Northern Ireland
 Gaelic football
 Rugby union in Ireland
 Rugby league in Ireland
 Australian rules football in Ireland
 :Category:American football in Ireland

Governing bodies

Association football
 Football Association of Ireland (ROI), the governing body for association football in the Republic of Ireland
 Irish Football Association (NI), the governing body for association football in Northern Ireland

Gaelic football
 Gaelic Athletic Association, Irish organization that promotes indigenous Gaelic games

See also
 Notre Dame Fighting Irish football, an American football team in Notre Dame, Indiana